Konotop is a city in Sumy Oblast, northern Ukraine.

Konotop may also refer to the following places:
In Ukraine:
Konotop, Chernihiv Oblast
Konotop, Khmelnytskyi Oblast
In Poland:
Konotop, Lubusz Voivodeship (west Poland)
Konotop, Choszczno County in West Pomeranian Voivodeship (north-west Poland)
Konotop, Drawsko County in West Pomeranian Voivodeship (north-west Poland)

Konotop is also a surname:

Kamila Konotop (born 2001), Ukrainian weightlifter